Chin Ho may refer to:
 Chin Ho Kelly, Hawaii Five-O character played by Kam Fong Chun, and later by Daniel Dae Kim
 Chin Haw, also spelled Chin Ho, Thai Chinese Muslims
 Chin Ho (name), Korean given name

See also
Chinn Ho (1904–1987), Chinese American entrepreneur in Hawaii